Nishpap Asami ( Innocent accused) is a 1997 Bengali drama film directed by Swapan Saha. This film has been music composed by Ashok Bhadra. This was the first Bengali film to cross 1.50Cr mark.

Cast
  Chiranjeet Chakraborty as Sanjoy Mitra
  Rituparna Sengupta
  Abhishek Chatterjee
  Indrani Dutta
  Dulal Lahiri
 Subhendu Chatterjee
  Subhasish Mukhopadhyay
  Anuradha Ray
  Chanchal Dutta
  Master Saranjit

References

External links
 Nishpap Asami at the Gomolo
 

Bengali-language Indian films
Bengali remakes of Hindi films
1997 films
1990s Bengali-language films
Films directed by Swapan Saha
Indian romantic drama films